The Clergy Marriage Act 1548 (2 & 3 Edw 6 c 21) was an Act of the Parliament of England. Part of the English Reformation, it abolished the prohibition on marriage of priests within the Church of England. (Before Henry VIII declared himself Supreme Head of the Church of England, ecclesiastical matters were governed exclusively by Roman Catholic canon law, over which the English monarch had no authority.)

The whole Act, so far as unrepealed, was repealed by section 1 of, and Part II of the Schedule to, the Statute Law (Repeals) Act 1969. (By virtue of Section 10 of the Interpretation Act 1889, this did not revive the ban.)

Section 2
This section, from "and be it" to "aforesaide" was repealed by section 1(1) of, and Part I of the Schedule to, the Statute Law Revision Act 1888.

Section 3
This section was repealed by section 1 of, and the Schedule to, the Statute Law Revision Act 1887.

See also
Marriage Act

References
Halsbury's Statutes,

Acts of the Parliament of England (1485–1603)
Clerical celibacy
1548 in law
1548 in England
Marriage law
Marriage, unions and partnerships in England
Repealed English legislation
Marriage and religion